Jichang, may refer to:

Town
 Jichang (Shuicheng County), a rural town in Shuicheng County, Guizhou, China
 Jichang (Qinglong County), a rural town in Qinglong County, Guizhou, China

Garden
 Jichang Garden (Chinese: 寄畅园), a garden in Xihui Park, Wuxi, Jiangsu, China

Transportation
 Airports in China (Chinese: 机场, pinyin: jīchǎng)